Hydnocarpus nanus is a species of plant in the family Achariaceae. It is a tree endemic to Peninsular Malaysia. It is threatened by habitat loss.

References

nana
Endemic flora of Peninsular Malaysia
Trees of Peninsular Malaysia
Near threatened plants
Taxonomy articles created by Polbot
Taxobox binomials not recognized by IUCN